KQDK-CD, virtual channel 33 (UHF digital channel 16), is a low-power, Class A television station licensed to Denver, Colorado, United States. It is a translator of Cheyenne, Wyoming–licensed Christian Television Network (CTN) owned-and-operated station KQCK (channel 39). KQDK's transmitter is located near East Iliff Avenue and South Emporia Avenue (near SH 83) in southeastern Denver; its parent station maintains studios on East Lincolnway (near US 30) in Cheyenne.

History
The station was founded on October 30, 1990. In 2008, under Equity Media Holdings ownership, KQDK became an affiliate of the Retro Television Network (RTN). On January 4, 2009, a contract conflict between Equity and Luken Communications (which had acquired RTN in June 2008) resulted in many RTN affiliates losing the network's programming. As a result, Luken moved RTN's operations to its headquarters in Chattanooga, Tennessee, and dropped its affiliations on all Equity-owned affiliates, including the then-KQDK-CA, immediately.  RTN would eventually sign with KCDO-TV that May. KQDK then switched its affiliation to AMGTV, and later to @SportsTV.

KQDK was sold at auction to Valley Bank on April 16, 2009. Valley Bank, in turn, filed to sell KQDK and KQCK to an ownership group connected to Fusion Communications on September 9.

In January 2010, VasalloVision announced that it would affiliate with parent station KQCK. KQDK-CA was acquired by Casa Media Partners in April 2012. The station switched its affiliation to MundoFox on August 13, 2012. Concurrent with the launch of the station's digital signal, on February 12, 2013, the station modified its call sign to KQDK-CD. In late 2014, KQDK dropped MundoFox for the Christian Television Network. Casa Media Partners filed for Chapter 11 bankruptcy on April 14, 2015. On April 12, 2017, CTN's parent company, the Christian Television Corporation, agreed to purchase KQDK-CD outright for $750,000; CTN had earlier agreed to purchase sister station KQCK. The sale was completed on June 30, 2017.

Sometime in 2019, KQDK-CD's city of license was moved from Aurora, Colorado to Denver.

Technical information

Subchannels
The station's digital signal is multiplexed:

Analog-to-digital conversion
KQDK-CD shut down its analog signal, over UHF channel 39, on February 12, 2013. The station flash-cut its digital signal into operation on its pre-transition UHF channel 39.

References

External links

Equity Media Holdings
QDK-CD
Television channels and stations established in 1990
1990 establishments in Colorado
Christian Television Network affiliates
Low-power television stations in the United States